Cheli-ye Olya (also Romanized as Chelī-ye ‘Olyā; also known as Chelī-ye Bālā) is a village in Estarabad Rural District, Kamalan District, Aliabad County, Golestan Province, Iran. At the 2006 census, its population was 29, in 11 families.

References 

Populated places in Aliabad County